Georgi Vins (1928–1998) was a Soviet religious dissident.

Vins or VINS may also refer to:

Vins (cartoonist) (1944–2014), Indian cartoonist
Vermont Institute of Natural Science

See also
 Vin (disambiguation)
 de Vins